Cowal Community Hospital is a community hospital in Dunoon on the Cowal peninsula, Argyll and Bute in the West of Scotland. It is managed by NHS Highland.

History
The hospital has its origins in the Dunoon Cottage Hospital on the corner of Alfred Street and King Street in Dunoon which opened in 1885. This was replaced by a new cottage hospital which was opened by Princess Louise in October 1908. A modern purpose-built facility was opened by the Duchess of Gloucester as the Dunoon and District General Hospital in November 1966. At the time it had 74 beds, mainly configured in four-bed wards. It changed its name to Cowal Community Hospital in c.2008.

Services
The hospital has a GP-led accident and emergency department, a maternity unit, dental surgery suite, an eight-bed general ward and there are also numerous consultant led clinics available at the hospital. It provides services for the Cowal peninsula population, numbering some fifteen thousand people.

References

External links
 

NHS Scotland hospitals
NHS Highland
Buildings and structures in Dunoon
Hospitals in Argyll and Bute
Hospital buildings completed in 1966
Hospitals established in 1885
1885 establishments in Scotland